‌
Yasmine Ashraf Sabri (born 21 January 1988) is an Egyptian actress.

Biography 
Sabri was born and raised in Alexandria. Her father, Ashraf Sabri, works as a doctor, while her mother is a swimmer. Her parents divorced later and Sabri claimed in an interview that she was only raised by her mother and grandmother and that she has not seen him since she was two years old, "There is no relationship between me and my father, but the separation is not a reason because people make choices in their life, and there are people who choose to take responsibility and complement the other, and other people choose themselves" she said. Sabri's father then published a set of photos of him with his daughter during her first engagement party, adding “After I heard the lies of my daughter who I raised in my house, and she was the owner of the house and she had a job… and she was able to stab her father in the back,” and that "family friends used to come to the house and see her staying there, and after she grew up I bought her a car."

In 2022, Sabri stated that she grew up as a poor child and studied in a public school in Alexandria, which was denied by her father, who took his Facebook account and denied her allegation, revealing that Sabri was a spoiled girl and said that the actress went to one of the highest elite schools in Alexandria with a wardrobe full of clothes from Paris. Sabri is currently turning a blind eye to all of this.

Career 
Following her debut in the television industry in 2013, Sabri played several supporting roles. She made her film debut with Hell in India in 2016. In 2018, she starred in two commercially successful films, Leilat Hana wa Surour  and El Diesel. In El Diesel, she played the role of Donia El-Sayyad, a popular actress alongside Mohamed Ramadan. In 2019, Sabri made her first television starring with Hekayti (transl. "My Story"), the following year, she starred in Forsa Tanya (transl. "Second Chance").

In April 2019, Sabri was named Ambassador of African Women during the Arab African Conference on Women's Empowerment in the presence of ministers and dignitaries from across the Arab region and the African continent. In January 2020, Sabri become the first Arab woman to star in Cartier's campaign for the Panthere De Cartier collection, she was featured alongside Italian model Mariacarla Boscono and British actresses Ella Balinska and Annabelle Wallis.

Personal life 
Sabri was married prior to her career in 2012. She revealed her marriage to the public for the first time in 2015. Then, in 2017, she stated on a television program that her husband's name is Muhammad, they separated later after five years of marriage.

In April 2020, Sabri married Egyptian businessman Ahmed Abu Hashima in a wedding ceremony with the presence of relatives only due to the COVID-19 epidemic.

At the 2020 El Gouna Film Festival, Sabri received backlash for her comments on the COVID-19 when she was asked about the pandemic by a reporter, "No, I am not obsessed with fear. I go on with my life," she said "Isn't there a possibility that we were infected with the virus and now it's gone? It's common sense, it's going to infect the whole world," she then said "Whoever gets it, gets it, and who moves on, moves, and survival is for the strongest."

Filmography

Films

TV series

References

External links 

 
 

1988 births
Living people
People from Alexandria
Egyptian film actresses
Egyptian television actresses
21st-century Egyptian actresses
Alexandria University alumni
Egyptian female models
Egyptian Muslims
21st-century Egyptian people